Perrotia ochracea is a butterfly in the family Hesperiidae. It is found in Madagascar (east and Île Sainte-Marie). The habitat consists of forests.

References

Butterflies described in 1937
Erionotini